Key Soap Concert Party was a popular comedy shows on TV from the mid 1990s to the early 2000s. The comedy show which was aired on Ghana Broadcasting Corporation's station, GTV featured the likes of  Kofi Adu, Nkomode, Samuel Kwadwo Boaben and Araba Stamp.

Featured actor and comedians
 Bob Santo
 Nkomode
 Bishop Bob Okala
 Kofi Adu
 Araba Stamp
 Akrobeto
 Paa George
 Mercy Asiedu
 Auntie B
 Waterproof
 Agya Ntow
 A1
 School Fees
 Koo Nimo
 Ekolac
 Mr Solomon
 Yaw Labito
 Felix Bell
 Abenkwan
 Asonaba Kwabrafoso Obuasi
 Orlando
 Abusuapanin Judas

References

Ghanaian comedy television series